The 2002–03 Scottish Inter-District Championship was a rugby union competition for Scotland's professional district teams. With the re-emergence of the Border Reivers professional team and the collapse of the Welsh-Scottish League to make way for a shortened Celtic League, the Scottish Rugby Union (SRU) reinstated the Scottish Inter-District Championship for the professional sides. Glasgow, Borders and Edinburgh then fought it out in a renamed Pro Cup sponsored by Bank of Scotland.

The Bank of Scotland Pro Cup lasted one year. When the Celtic League was expanded the following year the SRU realised that there was no room in the schedule for a separate Scottish Inter-District Championship. This was despite both sponsor and fans happiness with the return of a national tournament. (The desire for national bragging rights later led the SRU to establish the 1872 Cup in 2007-08 season using the Celtic League matches to determine the winner.)

2002-03 League Table

Results

Match 1

Match 2

Match 3

Match 4

Match 5

Match 6

Match 7

Match 8

Match 9

Match 10

Match 11

Match 12

2002–03 in Scottish rugby union
2002–03
Scot